William Hamilton O'Dell (October 11, 1938 – January 7, 2016) was an American businessman who served as a Republican in the South Carolina Senate from 1989 until his death. He was the CEO of O'Dell Corporation, Inc.

Early life and education
O'Dell was the son of William B. and Sara Francis O'Dell and was born in Ware Shoals, South Carolina. O'Dell earned a bachelor's degree from The Citadel in 1960. He and his wife Aedra Gayle Tisdale are the parents of two children, William B. O'Dell and Patricia Michelle Foster. Prior to being elected to the South Carolina State Senate, O'Dell served as vice-chairman of the Ware Shoals School District 51 board, and later as director of the South Carolina Chamber of Commerce.

South Carolina Senate
O'Dell was first elected to the South Carolina Senate in 1988. O'Dell was the chairman of the General committee. He also served on the Banking and Insurance, Finance, Interstate Cooperation and Labor, Commerce and Industry committees. O'Dell died in his sleep of a heart attack on January 7, 2016.

References

External links
South Carolina Legislature - Senator William H. O'Dell official SC Senate website
Project Vote Smart - Senator William H. 'Billy' O'Dell (SC) profile
Follow the Money - William H. O'Dell
2006 2004 2002 2000 campaign contributions

1938 births
2016 deaths
People from Ware Shoals, South Carolina
The Citadel, The Military College of South Carolina alumni
Businesspeople from South Carolina
School board members in South Carolina
Republican Party South Carolina state senators
21st-century American politicians
People from Greenwood, South Carolina
20th-century American businesspeople